Qarah Daraq-e Olya may refer to:
 Qarah Daraq-e Olya 1
 Qarah Daraq-e Olya 2